The following is a list of colleges and universities in the Commonwealth of Kentucky. Kentucky also has two early entrance to college programs, for academically gifted high school juniors and seniors, that allows the students to take college credits while finishing high school. They are the Craft Academy for Excellence in Science and Mathematics, and the Carol Martin Gatton Academy of Mathematics and Science.

Public universities

Private liberal arts colleges
 Alice Lloyd College
 Asbury University
 Bellarmine University
 Berea College
 Campbellsville University
 Centre College
 Georgetown College
 Kentucky Wesleyan College
 Lindsey Wilson College
 Midway University
 Spalding University
 Thomas More University
 Transylvania University
 Union College
 University of the Cumberlands
 University of Pikeville

Private colleges and universities
 American National University
 Asbury Theological Seminary
 Beckfield College
 Boyce College
 Brescia University
 Clear Creek Baptist Bible College
 Daymar College
 Frontier Nursing University 
 Kentucky Christian University
 Kentucky Mountain Bible College
 Lexington Theological Seminary
 Louisville Bible College 
 Louisville Presbyterian Theological Seminary
 Simmons College of Kentucky
 Southern Baptist Theological Seminary
 Strayer University
 Sullivan University

Kentucky Community and Technical College System

 Ashland Community and Technical College
 Big Sandy Community and Technical College
 Bluegrass Community and Technical College
 Elizabethtown Community and Technical College
 Gateway Community and Technical College
 Hazard Community and Technical College
 Henderson Community College
 Hopkinsville Community College
 Jefferson Community and Technical College
 Madisonville Community College
 Maysville Community and Technical College
 Owensboro Community and Technical College
 Somerset Community College
 Southcentral Kentucky Community and Technical College
 Southeast Kentucky Community and Technical College
 West Kentucky Community and Technical College

Kentucky dental schools
 University of Kentucky College of Dentistry
 University of Louisville School of Dentistry

Kentucky law schools
 Salmon P. Chase College of Law
 University of Kentucky College of Law
 University of Louisville School of Law

Kentucky medical schools
 University of Kentucky College of Medicine
 University of Louisville School of Medicine
 University of Pikeville Kentucky College of Osteopathic Medicine

Former institutions
 Mid-Continent University
 National College
 St. Catharine College
 Spencerian College
 Sue Bennett College
 Sullivan College of Technology and Design

See also

 List of college athletic programs in Kentucky
The Kentucky Council on Postsecondary Education
Higher education in the United States
 Lists of American institutions of higher education
 List of recognized higher education accreditation organizations

References

External links
 Department of Education listing of accredited institutions in Kentucky
 United States Department of Education, Office of Postsecondary Education

 
Kentucky, List of colleges and universities in
Universities and colleges